Aksharam is a 1995 Indian Malayalam film, directed by Sibi Malayil. The film stars Suresh Gopi, Annie, and Jagathy Sreekumar in lead roles. This film is noted for the first screen appearance of famous south Indian actor Kalabhavan Mani, who did a cameo role of an auto rickshaw driver. The film has a musical score by Perumbavoor G Ravindranath. In this movie, Gopi portrays a journalist, who loses everything for his job to find truth.

Cast

Suresh Gopi as Ananthakrishnan aka Ananthu
Annie as Meenu
Madhavi as Gayathri Devi
Dilshi Ishaan as Suresh Gopi's daughter 
Narendra Prasad as Krishna Moorthy
Anju Aravind as Usha
N. F. Varghese as Home minister Valappad Balakrishnan
Tej Sapru as Ramji
Jagathy Sreekumar as Tharakan
Kalabhavan Mani (cameo) as Auto driver
Jose Pellissery as Minister's Secretary
M. S. Thripunithura as Kunjikrishna Pothuval
Kozhikode Narayanan Nair as Vaidyanathan 
Subadra as Kasthuriammal
Santhakumari as Kunjikrishna Pothuval's wife
Baby Sonia as Bindu Balakrishnan
T. P. Madhavan as Madhava Menon
K. R. Vatsala as Subadra
Eliyas Babu as Madhavan 
Swapna Ravi as Radhamani
Rajeev Rangan as Soman

Soundtrack
The music was composed by Perumbavoor G. Ravindranath and the lyrics were written by Gireesh Puthenchery.

References

External links
 

1995 films
1990s Malayalam-language films
Films scored by Perumbavoor G. Raveendranath